Bostrak is a village in the Tørdal district of Drangedal municipality, Norway. It is located near the western shore of Bjorvatnet lake.

Country music singer Sputnik is from Bostrak and still owns a home here.

Villages in Vestfold og Telemark